Horsham and Worthing was a county constituency in West Sussex, centred on the towns of Horsham and Worthing in West Sussex. It returned one Member of Parliament (MP)  to the House of Commons of the Parliament of the United Kingdom, elected by the first past the post system.

History
The constituency was created for the 1918 general election, and abolished for the 1945 general election.  Its territory was then divided between the new constituencies of Worthing and Horsham.

Boundaries
The Borough of Worthing, the Urban Districts of Horsham, Shoreham, and Southwick, and the Rural Districts of Horsham, Steyning West, and Thakeham.

Members of Parliament

Throughout its existence, the constituency elected the same MP, Edward Turnour, 6th Earl Winterton, who had previously been MP for Horsham. When the Horsham constituency was re-established in 1945, Turnour was re-elected there, and held that seat until he stepped down at the 1951 general election after 47 years in Parliament.

Election results

Elections in the 1910s

Elections in the 1920s

Elections in the 1930s 

General Election 1939–40:

Another General Election was required to take place before the end of 1940. The political parties had been making preparations for an election to take place and by the Autumn of 1939, the following candidates had been selected; 
Conservative: Edward Turnour
Labour: A W Wright
British Union: Jorian Jenks

References

Parliamentary constituencies in South East England (historic)
Constituencies of the Parliament of the United Kingdom established in 1918
Constituencies of the Parliament of the United Kingdom disestablished in 1945
Politics of West Sussex
Horsham
Politics of Worthing